Candelaria Municipal Museum is a museum located in the 31st avenue in Candelaria, Cuba. It was established as a museum on 31 May 1982.

The museum holds collections on history, archeology, weaponry and numismatics.

See also 
 List of museums in Cuba

References 

Museums in Cuba
Buildings and structures in Artemisa Province
Museums established in 1982
1982 establishments in Cuba
20th-century architecture in Cuba